The Roen is a mountain of the Nonsberg group on the border between South Tyrol and Trentino, Italy.

References 
 Alpenverein South Tyrol

External links 

Mountains of the Alps
Mountains of South Tyrol
Nonsberg Group
Mountains of Trentino